Grey Ghost Press was founded in 1994 by Ann Dupuis after spending time working on the Fudge RPG system by Steffan O'Sullivan. She initially created the company as Wild Mule Games in 1994, incorporated her company the following year as Ghostdancer Press, and then renamed it Grey Ghost Press.

The company soon became the owner of the copyright to Fudge and began officially publishing the system with their first release Fudge 1995 Edition. Later they re-released the system as Fudge 1995 Expanded Edition.

The company also published other games based on the Fudge rules, such as Gatecrasher and Terra Incognita.

In 2000, Grey Ghost received the rights to publish an RPG based on Katherine Kurtz's fantasy world Deryni and the Eleven Kingdoms.

The Deryni Adventure Game was nominated for the "Role-Playing Game of the Year" at the 1997 Origins Game Fair Awards.

Katherine Kurtz said in the foreword of the book "...I was approached about letting Grey Ghost Press publish a role-playing game based on my world. This wasn't the first time someone had made such a request, but this one felt 'right'."

Fudge RPG 

The Freeform Universal Donated Game Engine was created in 1992 by Steffan O'Sullivan on the rec.games.design newsgroup. Its design focuses more on the story and the player instead of dice throws.

References

External links 
 Grey Ghost Press' Fudge webpage
 Deryni Realms Deryni Homepage

Companies based in Massachusetts
Board game publishing companies
Role-playing game publishing companies
Publishing companies established in 1994
1994 establishments in Massachusetts